The 2020 Porsche Carrera Cup Italia season was the 14th Porsche Carrera Cup Italy season. The six-race season began on 18 July in Mugello and ended on 8 November at Monza.

Calendar
All races were held in Italy.

Teams and drivers

Results
Bold indicates the overall winner.

References 

Porsche Carrera Cup Italy seasons
Porsche Carrera Cup